The Dublin Minor Club Hurling Championship is a Gaelic Athletic Association competition between the top teams in minor club hurling in County Dublin. Raheny GAA are the current title holders. The Dublin Minor Club Hurling Championship is regarded as the pinnacle of the season.

Minor A Championship

Roll of Honour

Minor B Championship

Roll of Honour

Minor C Championship

Roll of Honour

Minor D Championship

Top winners

Roll of Honour

Minor E Championship

Roll of Honour

References

External links
Official Dublin Website
Dublin on Hoganstand
Dublin Club GAA
Reservoir Dubs

 2